Atlético Ensenada Fútbol Club was a Mexican professional football team based in Ensenada, Baja California, Mexico that should have played in the in Liga de Balompié Mexicano.

History 
On October 30, 2019, the creation of a football team in the city of Ensenada was announced, which would play in the first division from 2020, however, it was reported that the club would participate in a league other than Liga MX.

On March 23, 2020 the franchise was officially announced, also being the first confirmed club of the Liga de Balompié Mexicano. A month later, Ramón Ramírez was appointed as sports director. On May 4, Carlos Torres Garcés was confirmed as manager of the club. 

On September 29, 2020, the club was expelled from the LBM because the league considered that it did not comply with the guarantees to participate in the competition.

Stadium 
Atlético Ensenada would play their matches their home matches at the Estadio Municipal de Ensenada, which currently has a capacity for 7,600 spectators. On June 23, 2020 a project was announced to expand the capacity of this venue and reach 20,190 spectators, the construction would be carried  out in three stages.

Personnel

Management

References 

Association football clubs established in 2020
2020 establishments in Mexico
Football clubs in Baja California
Liga de Balompié Mexicano Teams